Ernest Brander Macnaghten CMG, DSO (1872–1948) was a British Army officer who also served as the chairman of the Shanghai Municipal Council from 1930 to 1932.

Early life

Macnaghten was born 11 September 1872 in India, the son of William Hay Macnaghten and Alice Ellen Brander. He was educated at Wellington College, Berkshire and the Royal Military Academy, Woolwich, where he was awarded the Sword of Honour.

Military career

Macnaghten was commissioned in the Royal Artillery in November 1894. He served in India (1894–1896), West Africa (1898–1899), South Africa (1900–1902), Somaliland (1903–1904), India (1905–1909), England (1910–1914) and in France during World War I where he was awarded two brevets, CMG, DSO, Croix de Guerre and eight mentions in dispatches. He rose to the rank of colonel.

Shanghai

After the war, Macnaghten resigned his commission with the honorary rank of brigadier general.

He joined British American Tobacco in Shanghai, China. From 1930 to 1932 he served as Chairman of the Shanghai Municipal Council. He was also President of the United Services Association and the St Andrew's Society.

Marriage and children

Macnaghten married Yvonne Marie Forrester at Windsor, England on 4 October 1906. They had five children, Susan May, Joan Yvonne Marie, Audrey Clarisse and James Steuart (twins) and Garrelle Renee.

Retirement and death

Macnaghten retired to his house Haygates in Finchampstead, Berkshire.  He died on 21 November 1948 in the same town.

References

External links
Picture of Macnaghten in military uniform
Picture of McNaghten in 1937 arriving for a meeting of the Nanshi Supervisory Committee Meeting
Picture of Macnaghten at an Armistice Day ceremony at the Shanghai cenotaph in 1939
Article about and picture of plaque unveiled by Macnaghten in Shanghai in 1931

History of Shanghai
Chairmen of the Shanghai Municipal Council
1872 births
1948 deaths
Royal Artillery officers
British Army personnel of World War I
British Army personnel of the Second Boer War
Companions of the Order of St Michael and St George
Companions of the Distinguished Service Order
Recipients of the Croix de Guerre 1914–1918 (France)
People from Finchampstead
Military personnel of British India
British Army brigadiers